Elaeocarpus sedentarius, commonly known as Minyon quandong, is a species of flowering plant in the family Elaeocarpaceae and is endemic to a restricted area of New South Wales. It is a medium-sized to large tree with elliptic to egg-shaped leaves, racemes of whitish flowers and more or less spherical blue fruit.

Description
The lower surface of the leaves is glaucous with scattered hairs and old leaves turn orange to dull red before falling. Flowering occurs in spring or summer and the is a fruit blue, more or less spherical drupe  in diameter with a sculptured stone.

Taxonomy
Elaeocarpus sedentarius was first formally described in 2008 by David J. Maynard and Darren M. Crayn in Australian Systematic Botany from specimens collected by Maynard in Mount Jerusalem National Park.

Distribution and habitat
Minyon quandong grows in warm-temperate rainforest in a small area on the south of the Mount Warning caldera in northern New South Wales. A single wild tree was also discovered in the north of the caldera, approximately 35 km north of the rest of the populations. This tree occurs in brush box ecotone areas and warm temperate rainforests.

Conservation status
This quandong is listed as endangered under the Australian Government Environment Protection and Biodiversity Conservation Act 1999 and the New South Wales Government Biodiversity Conservation Act 2016. A Recovery Plan for the species (as Elaeocarpus sp. Rocky Creek) has been prepared.

References

sedentarius
Oxalidales of Australia
Trees of Australia
Flora of New South Wales
Plants described in 2008